Cocido montañés ('highlander stew' or 'mountain stew') is a rich hearty Spanish bean stew, originally from and most commonly found in Cantabria in northern Spain.

Cocido montañés is a warm and heavy dish whose origin is the 17th century and it was cooked to fight against the cold and wet climate in the Cantabrian mountains. For that reason it is most commonly eaten during winter and at the largest meal of the day, lunch. The pork is killed during the autumn and preserved to be used during winter. As it is a heavy, high-calorie meal, it is served as a main course.

Ingredients
Cocido montañés is made with two vegetable ingredients: dried large white beans (alubia blanca, soaked overnight before use) and collard greens (berza). Some recipes use local red bean caricu montañés instead of white beans or cabbage instead of hard-to-find collard greens. The rest of the elements of this recipe are known as compangu which refers to the meat ingredients from the pig slaughter: bacon (tocino), pork ribs (costilla), black pudding (morcilla) and sausage (chorizo).

See also
 Cassoulet
 Cocido lebaniego
 Cocido madrileño
 Cozido à portuguesa
 Fabada asturiana
 Feijoada
 Baked beans
 Common bean (Phaseolus vulgaris)
 Olla podrida
 Pork and beans
 Cantabrian cuisine

Montañés
Cocidos
National dishes